Birmingham Wheels Park (formerly Wheels Adventure Park) is a dedicated Wheeled-sports park with a short-track oval motor racing circuit, MSA approved kart circuit, drifting arenas, off-road rally stage and the UK's only purpose-built outdoor speed-skating arena. It is based in the Bordesley Green area of Birmingham, England. Formerly run by a Charitable Company Limited by Guarantee, and controlled by Birmingham City Council. It is now operated by Motor Racing Live Ltd.

History
The park was initially run by the West Midlands Probation Service.

The Stockcar Racing arena is a  oval, with spectator terracing surrounding two corners of the circuit along with the home stretch. Built with a cinder surface, after the Birmingham Brummies speedway team finished, the track was red with tarmac. 
Until 2019, racing events on the oval track was run by Incarace,
Since 2020, the Track survived an attempt at being closed by Birmingham City Council  and the oval racing operations were taken over by "Promotasport International" (PRI) 
for all ages from 6ys old and upwards.

This is just one of six diverse arenas onsite - each hosting a different (or several different) wheeled sports. The venue aims to create social capital through sporting excellence  and many national and international champions started their skating or racing careers at the Park.

Community projects

Speed skating 
Birmingham Wheels has a speed skating track which is a community-based project and is supported and funded by the licensees and tenants of the venue. It encourages children to 'get off their computers and engage in active and wholesome exercise.

Sensory garden 
There is a sensory garden on site for people to come and experience the smells and textures.

Community Payback 
The site is the base for the current Community Payback Team for the central Birmingham area.

Motorsports hosted at the venue 
Many different classes of motorsport and training facilities are held on the site by the licensees and tenants of the park, these include;

Drifting 
The sport of drifting was first hosted at the venue in 2006 when Japanese professional drifters came to the UK and held events to promote the sport. Since then the city center venue has hosted practice, training, and competitive events hosted for local, national, and international drivers. In 2012 Drift Allstars saw Irish drifter Alan Sinnot take 1st place podium from Australian driver Luke Fink after his tire came off a mid-battle in front of a sell-out crowd. Luke would later return to the UK and help create and host at Birmingham Wheels Raceway, what was at the time, the largest prize money event within the sport.

The drifting academies on site have been in operation since 2008, Drift Allstars originally started, followed by Learn2drift Ltd in 2012, and in 2014 when drift Allstars went into liquidation the charity owners of the park sold the cars they held for nonpayment of rent to Flatout factory, who later rebranded as Pro Drift Academy UK.

When the park was reopened in July 2020 Learn2drift Ltd took overall control of the drift training on the site due to the size of their operations, allowing for a central base in the UK for their disabled driver training and intensive drift training, allowing youngsters from the age of 12 years old a way into competitive driving.

In 2021, one of L2D’s drivers became the second professional driver to earn his Pro2 British drift championships license at just the age of 13 years old. Mitchell Gibbons, now earning the right to become an instructor within the L2D team.

The park has been featured in 2022 in episode 2 of BBC’s” Gassed up series” filmed before the council closed the park in October 2021.

Several special events were held that assisted drivers from all over the UK who suffered from disability and mental health issues, which allowed for L2D to open during full lockdown during the covid-19 pandemic. This now has been taken away with the remaining community asset of the park, by the council since the closure in October 2021.

A government-appointed inspector in 2017 confirmed that the council must allow for the continuation of the sporting facilities of BWP to either be relocated or built within the regeneration plans, however, The labor council of Birmingham, obtained 15 million pounds, by stating the park was a former site, and then to level up the sporting facility to sell of the land for housing and warehousing developments, a sad end to 40 years of sporting activities within the heart of the UK.

Karting 
The  International Kart Circuit is where Nigel Mansell started his career.  The Grand Prix Karting center also features junior and practice circuits and runs events on the main circuit for companies, charities and groups, and club members as well as enthusiasts.

Stock car racing 
The short circuit oval hosts many versions of Stock car racing every Saturday evening including rounds of BRISA Formula 1 and Formula 2.

Filming - television and adverts 
The site has been the location of several filming shoots including;

 The Gadget Show
 A Question of Sport
 Brum

Future of the circuits 
The future of the site was thrown into doubt when in 2006 plans were unveiled for the City of Birmingham Stadium. The large stadium/casino complex (which would also have been the new home for nearby Birmingham City F.C) would have been built on the Wheels complex, including the Birmingham Wheels Oval circuit. However, with the government shelving, and the introduction of 'super casinos', the future for Birmingham Wheels Park seemed secure.

Many Councillors and advocates for the park have worked hard to ensure the future of the Park, including Cllr Bob Beauchamp who has worked hard over many years to keep and grow the Park on behalf of residents and sports enthusiasts nationwide.

The short circuit oval has been recognized as a participation Sports venue and as such if this facility were to be removed from the people of Birmingham it has been established that the local authority must provide an alternative venue of the same or better standard. The community of users regularly accessing the site feel very strongly that this unique Park has manifest public benefit - and with there being so many derelict sites in the city, there has been a persuasive argument that sporting facilities such as Birmingham Wheels Park should be protected.

Following the issuing of the new lease on the Park to Motor Racing Live in March 2020, there have been numerous improvements to the venue.

See also
 Hednesford Hills Raceway Incarace short circuit

References

External links
Birmingham Wheels Park official website
Grand Prix Karting official website
Motor Racing Live official website
Learn 2 Drift official website
Incarace page
Rally Rides official website

Sports venues in Birmingham, West Midlands
Stock car racing venues